A2B is a brand of electric bicycles owned by Hero Eco Group. They have offices in the United Kingdom and the United States.

History

The company is owned by Indian manufacturer Hero Eco, which acquired Ultra Motor in 2011.

The A2B company launched the metro in 2009, the first specially designed bike frame for electric motors. It was reviewed by Wired. In 2013, Hero Eco rebranded as A2B. The brand remained owned by Hero Eco Group.

In 2013, it released the electric bike Kuo.

Hero Electric in 2018 released the e-bicycles A2B Speed and Kuo Boost.

In 2012, Hero Eco acquired the two-wheeler division of Ultra Motor. In 2013, A2B bikes were manufactured in Taiwan, and manufacturing moved to Europe in 2014 and 2015.

Between 2012 and 2013, Hero Eco sold around 9,000 units of A2B bike in 22 countries.

Models
A2B replaced the metro with the upgraded version now called the Octave. The Alva Plus is a lighter, sportier version. The Shima has speeds up to 28 mph. The lightest ebikes are the Ferber, Galvani, and the folding Kuo Plus.

In 2009, it released the Ultramotor A2B electric bicycle.

In February 2018, Hero Electric launched in India a new faster, range. This comprised an e-scooter codenamed the AXLHE-20, and two e-bicycles, the A2B Speed and Kuo Boost. The AXLHE-20 claims a top speed of 85 km/h along with a maximum range of 110 kilometres on one charge. The A2B Speed, that can be ridden both using electric or pedal power, has a maximum speed of 45 km/h.

See also

 List of electric bicycle brands and manufacturers
 Outline of cycling

References

External links
 

Cycle manufacturers of the United States
Electric bicycles
Cycle types
Bicycle
History of cycling
Micromobility
Electric
Road cycles